Lewis Lake is an unincorporated community in Brunswick Township, Kanabec County, Minnesota, United States.  The community is located between Braham and Ogilvie.

Kanabec County Roads 4, 12, and 48 are three of the main routes in the community.  State Highway 47 (MN 47) is nearby.  ZIP codes 55006 (Braham), 56358 (Ogilvie), and 55051 (Mora) all meet near Lewis Lake.

Lewis Lake is located in section 19 of Brunswick Township.

References

Unincorporated communities in Minnesota
Unincorporated communities in Kanabec County, Minnesota